Ontario High School may refer to:

 Ontario High School (California) in Ontario, California
 Ontario High School (Ohio) in Ontario, Ohio
 Ontario High School (Oregon) in Ontario, Oregon